Biʾr ʿAlī is a village in eastern Yemen. It is located in the Shabwah Governorate.  The name means "Ali's Well" in Arabic. In pre-Islamic times, the port was called Qanīʾ (Qane, Cana).

Ancient history

Literature
In antiquity, Qanīʾ was mainly a trading port for spices from India and Eastern coast of Africa. Describing the part of his voyage after leaving the Red Sea and Aden, the author of the Periplus of the Erythraean Sea wrote in 50 CE:

Archaeological finds
Wine jars (amphorae) dating back to the 1st century CE were discovered in Biʾr ʿAlī in 1988, in an underwater excavation along the shores of the Indian Ocean. On one of the jars is inscribed a word in the Palmyrene (Tadmori) alphabet and a word in Syriac script. The conclusion drawn by researchers, B. Davidde and R. Petriaggi, is that from the mid-1st century CE wine was imported from Italy and Syria upon camels that disembarked from Coptos (Qift) which lies along the banks of the Nile River in Egypt, thence unto ports Myos Hormos – a place that later became known as al-Quṣayr – and Berenike  situated on the western shore of the Red Sea, and from there transported by ship to trade centers in Arabia, Ethiopia and India.

The alleged ruins of a Jewish synagogue were also discovered in Biʾr ʿAlī, dating back to at least the 3rd century CE. It is presumed that Jewish merchants from Hellenistic communities outside of Yemen may have eventually chosen to settle in that place, where they would have been occupied in the trade of aromatics. This assumption is based on the five-lined Greek inscription that was preserved in the synagogue of ancient Qanīʻ (Biʾr ʿAlī), the content of which being a petition by a man named Kosmās unto the One God (eis theos) that he will protect his caravan (synodia) while traversing the vast wastelands.

However, the identification of the site has been strongly questioned by scientists: "The mirage of Qanīʾ’s Jews serves as a cautionary tale. ... What we don’t know is this: almost anything about the functionof the buildings excavated in Sector Three at Qanīʾ"

See also
Wahidi Sultanate  of Biʾr ʿAlī

External links
Hadramawt Towns and villages in the Hadhramaut Governorate

Bibliography
 A. V. Sedov, New archaeological and epigraphic material from Qana, South Arabia. Arabian Archaeology and Epigraphy, (1992) pp. 110-137
 ibid., Qana’ (Yemen) and the Indian Ocean: The archaeological evidence. In: H. P. Raye & J.-F. Salles (eds), Tradition and archaeology: Early Maritime Contacts in the Indian Ocean. Proceedings of the International Seminar Techno-archaeological Perspectives of Seafaring in the Indian Ocean 4th cent. BC–15th cent. AD, New Delhi, Feb. 28–March 4, 1994, Lyon-New Delhi (1996), pp. 11–35
 Jean-François Breton, Arabia Felix from the Time of the Queen of Sheba: Eighth Century B.C. to First Century A.D. Translated from the French by Albert LaFarge. Notre Dame, Indiana (1999)
 Françoise Briquel-Chatonnet, Les graffiti en langues nord-sémitique de Bīr ‘Alī (Qāni’). In: J.F. Salles & A. Sedov (eds.), Qāni’: Le poet antique de Hadramawt entre la Méditerannée, l'Afrique et L'Inde, Fouilles Russes 1972, 1985-89, 1991, 1993-94, Lyon 201 (2010), pp. 387
 Joseph Patrich, Bet kǝneset yǝhudi qadum bǝ‘ir ha-namel qani she-bǝ-teman. Qadmoniyyot 142 (2011), pp. 102–106 (Hebrew)
 Barbara Davidde & Roberto Petriaggi, Considerations on commercial trades of Laodiceum and Amineum wines through the underwater archaeological findings in the port of Qani’. In: S. Antonini, A. Shu‘lân & Munir Arbach (eds), Sabaean Studies: Archaeological, Epigraphical and Historical Studies in Honour of Yusuf Abdallah, Alessandro de Maigret, Christian Robin on the occasion of their 60th birthday (2005), pp. 85–95. Naples-Ṣan‘ā’

References

Populated places in Shabwah Governorate
Villages in Yemen
Ancient history of Yemen
Ancient Greek geography of Arabia
Ports and harbours of Yemen